Deliciously Amoral is a 1969 Argentine sex comedy film directed by Julio Porter, starring Libertad Leblanc, Guillermo Bredeston, and Rodolfo Onetto.

Cast
Libertad Leblanc
Guillermo Bredeston
Myriam de Urquijo
Rodolfo Onetto
Roberto Airaldi
Guillermo Battaglia
Héctor Méndez
Maurice Jouvet
Horace Lannes
Osvaldo Brandi

References

External links
 

1969 films
1960s Spanish-language films
Films directed by Julio Porter
Argentine sex comedy films
1960s sex comedy films
1969 comedy films
1960s Argentine films